Happy Hour! is a Japanese exclusive compilation album by the American punk rock band The Offspring. It was released on August 4, 2010. The album chronicles tracks from approximately 15 years of the band's career. It is the first album by the Offspring not to be released in the United States.

The album includes live versions and remixes of tracks from their studio albums Smash, Ixnay on the Hombre, Americana, Conspiracy of One, and Splinter. Although it was released two years after Rise and Fall, Rage and Grace, this compilation does not contain any live versions and remixes of tracks from that album. It also includes songs from soundtracks and various B-sides. The album also contains covers of tracks by bands such as The Buzzcocks, Iggy & The Stooges, T.S.O.L., Billy Roberts, and AC/DC. Happy Hour! has sold +600,890 copies worldwide.

Numerous non-LP tracks compiled from 1997 to 2004, most are included, with the exception of a few omissions:
 "Smash It Up" (The Damned cover) from the Batman Forever soundtrack (1995)
 "Smash It Up" (live, Damned cover) from "The Meaning of Life" single (1997)
 "All I Want" (live) from "I Choose" single (1997)
 "Pretty Fly (for a White Guy)" (The Geek Mix) from "Pretty Fly (for a White Guy) single (1998)
 "Pretty Fly (for a White Guy)" (Spanish Version) from "Pretty Fly (for a White Guy) single (1998)
 "Pretty Fly (for a White Guy)" (Baka Boys Low Rider Remix) from "Pretty Fly (for a White Guy) single (1998)
 "Pretty Fly (for a White Guy)" (Dust Boys Space Echo Remix) from "Pretty Fly (for a White Guy) single (1998)
 "Pretty Fly (for a White Guy)" (Dust Bros Dust Mix) from "Pretty Fly (for a White Guy) single (1998)
 "I Wanna Be Sedated" (Ramones cover) from the Idle Hands soundtrack (1999)
 "Walla Walla" (live) from "The Kids Aren't Alright" single (1999)
 "Why Don't You Get a Job?" (live) from "The Kids Aren't Alright" single (1999)

Track listing

Personnel

The Offspring
Greg K. – bass, backing vocals
Dexter Holland – lead vocals, rhythm guitar, piano
Noodles – lead guitar, backing vocals
Ron Welty – drums, percussion on all tracks except 1, 6 and 7
Atom Willard – drums, percussion on Tracks 1, 6 and 7

References

The Offspring compilation albums
B-side compilation albums
2010 compilation albums
Columbia Records compilation albums
Albums produced by Thom Wilson
Albums produced by Dave Jerden
Albums produced by Brendan O'Brien (record producer)